CineAlta cameras are a series of professional digital movie cameras produced by Sony that replicate many of the same features of 35mm film motion picture cameras.

Concept 

CineAlta is a brand name used by Sony to describe various products involved in content creation, production and exhibition process within digital cinema workflow. Now Sony's products branded as CineAlta include camera, camcorder, recorder, cinema server, and projector. "CineAlta" is a portmanteau of Cine, from cinematography, and Alta, an Italian word for "high".

Logo

The first CineAlta logo was designed by Hiroki Oka, Chief Art Director of Sony CreativeWorks Corporation, based at the Sony Atsugi Technology Center. The twinned ribbons represent the marriage of film and videotape, arranged in a way to deliberately evoke the infinity symbol, to symbolize the infinite possibilities. The CineAlta logo was updated by Tetsuro Sano and applied for the first time to the F65.

Format 
CineAlta cameras record onto HDCAM tapes, XDCAM Professional Discs, SRMemory, or SxS flash memory cards. They have the ability to shoot at various frame rates including 24fps and a resolution of up to 8K. The camera can be used with a Miranda DVC 802 converter. This allows the camera to output SDI, DV, and multiple HD outputs.

History and use in motion pictures 
In June 1999, George Lucas announced that Episode II of the Star Wars Prequel Trilogy would be the first major motion picture to be shot 100% digitally. Sony and Panavision had teamed up to develop the High Definition 24p camera that Lucas would use to accomplish this, and thus the first CineAlta camera was born: the Sony HDW-F900 (also called the Panavision HD-900F after being "panavised"). However, the science-fiction film Vidocq was actually the first released feature that was shot entirely with digital cinematography. Lucas held a private screening of Star Wars: Episode II – Attack of the Clones for the Atsugi Technology Center staff, and inserted a credit to specifically thank the Sony engineers at Atsugi for the use of the HDW-F900.

For Star Wars: Episode III – Revenge of the Sith the more advanced Sony HDC-F950 was used, with higher resolution and better color reproduction than its predecessor. The film was cropped to a 2.40:1 aspect ratio from its native 16:9 frame. As a result, only 818 of the 1080 vertical pixels were actually used. An anamorphic adapter lens is available from Canon to allow shooting in 2.39:1 without losing any pixels. Manuel Huerga's Salvador is the first movie shot with this adapter.

2002's Russian Ark was recorded in uncompressed high definition video using a Sony HDW-F900. The information was recorded uncompressed onto a hard disk which could hold 100 minutes, thus allowing the entire film to be shot in a single 86 minute take. Four attempts were made to complete the shot, which had to be completed in one day due to the Hermitage Museum being closed for the shoot. The first three had to be interrupted due to technical faults, but the fourth attempt was completed successfully. Extra material on the DVD release includes a documentary on the technology used.

Other notable movies that were shot with CineAlta cameras include:

 All About Lily Chou-Chou (2001, shot August 2000)
 Session 9 (released 2001, shot September – October 2000)
 Burning Annie (released 2007, shot February 2002)
 Once Upon a Time in Mexico (released 2003, shot May 2001)
 Spy Kids 2: The Island of Lost Dreams (2002)
 Spy Kids 3-D: Game Over (2003)
 Dogville (2003)
 Scacco pazzo (2003)
 Sky Captain and the World of Tomorrow (2004)
 The World (2004)
 Zebraman (2004)
 Sin City (2005)
 Caché (film) (2005)
 Crank (2006)
 U2 3D (2007)
 Cloverfield (2008)
 Rachel Getting Married (2008)
 Yesterday Was a Lie (2008)
 Tetro (2009)
 Public Enemies (2009)
 Avatar (2009)
 Tron: Legacy (2010)
 Real Steel (2011)
 Just Go with It (2011)
 Shark Night 3D (2011)
 The Darkest Hour (2011)
 Sanctum (2011)
 The Sunset Limited (2011)
 Mirror Mirror (2012)
 Oblivion (2013)
 After Earth (2013)
 White House Down (2013)
 The Smurfs 2 (2013)
 Evil Dead (2013)
 Winter Sleep (2014)
 Lucy (2014)
 6 Underground (2019)
 21 Bridges (2019)
 Downton Abbey (2019)
 Harriet (2019)
 Two of Us (2019)
 Ma Rainey's Black Bottom (2020)
 The Life Ahead (2020)
 Unhinged (2020)
 Quo Vadis, Aida? (2020)
 Bad Boys for Life (2020)
 Tesla (2020)
 The Glorias (2020)
 I Care a Lot (2020)
 Parallel Mothers (2021)
 Coda (2021)
 Black Widow (2021)
 Annette (2021)
 Reminiscence (2021)
 The Mauritanian (2021)
 Cherry (2021)
 Wrath of Man (2021)
 Tom & Jerry (2021)
 Voyagers (2021)
 Peter Rabbit 2: The Runaway'' (2021)

List of CineAlta cameras 
All cameras are made by Sony except where noted:

 VENICE 2 (2021)
 VENICE (2015)
 F55/F5 (2014)
 NEX-FS700 (2011)
 F65 (2011)
 PMW-F3 (2010)
 SRW-9000PL (2010)
 PMW-500 (2010)
 PDW-F800/700 (2008-2009)
 F35/F23 (2008)
 PMW-EX3 (2008)
 PMW-EX1/EX1R (2006, EX1R in 2009)
 HDW-F900R (2006)
 PDW-F350/F330 (2006)
 HDC-F950 (2003)
 HDW-F900 (2000)

Notes

See also 
 Sony camcorders
 Digital cinematography
 Panavision HD-900F
 PMW-EX1
 AXIOM (camera)

References

External links 
 Official CineAlta page
 Sony Professional
 Sony's first global news release of F35
 Sony US's announcement with information of CineAlta 4K

Digital movie cameras
Sony camcorders
Japanese inventions
1999 introductions
Audiovisual introductions in 1999

pl:Sony Cinealta